The Copa de la Reina de Baloncesto 2015 was the 53rd edition of the Spanish Queen's Basketball Cup. It is managed by the Spanish Basketball Federation – FEB and was held in Torrejón de Ardoz, in the Pabellón Jorge Garbajosa on February 14–15, 2015.

Perfumerías Avenida won its fifth Copa de la Reina title.

Qualified teams
On November 14, the Spanish Basketball Federation awarded the organization of the Cup to the city of Torrejón de Ardoz, qualifying Rivas Ecópolis as host team. In accordance with the competition rules, the three top teams at the end of first leg of the LFB Regular Season, would qualify for the tournament.

Standings after Round 13

|}

Draw
The draw was held in Torrejón de Ardoz on January 26, 2015.

Perfumerías Avenida and Spar Citylift Girona were the seeded teams, who were drawn against Rivas Ecópolis and CB Conquero Huelva Wagen respectively

Bracket

Final

References and notes

External links
2015 Copa de la Reina official website

2015
2014–15 in Spanish women's basketball
2014–15 in Spanish basketball cups